Katherine Ann Olivier (née Ricks; born November 6, 1959) is an American college basketball coach who most recently was the women's basketball head coach at UNLV. She resigned from that position on March 6, 2020.

Early life and education
Born Katherine Ann Ricks in Los Angeles County, Olivier graduated from Valencia High School in Placentia, California in 1977. As Kathy Ricks, Olivier played collegiate basketball and tennis at Cal State Fullerton from 1977 to 1979 and UNLV basketball from 1979 to 1981. She was the leading scorer in both her seasons at Cal State Fullerton, averaging 15.6 points and 9.2 rebounds as a freshman and 19.3 points and 7.7 rebounds as a sophomore. At UNLV, Olivier earned honorable mention All-America honors in 1980 after a junior season averaging 16.3 points and 5.7 rebounds. In her fourth consecutive year as her team's leading scorer, Olivier averaged 20.2 points and 9.2 rebounds as a senior in 1980–81. Olivier graduated from UNLV in 1981 with a degree in physical education.

Coaching career

Assistant coach (1981–1993)
Olivier began her coaching career in 1981 as a graduate assistant at UNLV, followed by a season as an assistant coach at UC Irvine in 1982–83.

From 1983 to 1986, Olivier was an assistant coach at USC under Linda Sharp, including USC's 1984 national championship team.

Olivier moved to rival UCLA as an assistant coach under Billie Moore in 1986. In seven seasons with Olivier on the staff, UCLA had five winning seasons and two NCAA Tournament appearances, including a run to the Sweet 16 in 1992.

UCLA (1993–2008)
Following Moore's resignation, UCLA promoted Olivier to head coach on May 3, 1993. In 15 seasons at UCLA, Olivier went 232–208, with the program's first Pac-10 regular season title in 1999 and first Pac-10 Tournament title in 2006. UCLA made five NCAA Tournaments (1998–2000, 2004, 2006), with its most successful run being to the Elite Eight in 1999. Following a 16–15 season, Olivier resigned from UCLA on March 11, 2008.

UNLV (2008–2020)
Returning to her alma mater, Olivier became women's basketball head coach at UNLV on April 22, 2008. After losing records for the first three seasons, UNLV went 22–10 in 2011–12 with a second place finish in the Mountain West Conference and WNIT appearance. Since the 2011–12 season, UNLV has always had .500 or better records in Mountain West play, but UNLV's next season with an overall winning record was in 2015–16 with an 18–14 finish. In 2016–17, UNLV had its second straight winning overall season at 22–11 (12–6 MW) and made the WNIT for its second postseason appearance under Olivier.  After 12 years as UNLV head coach, Olivier resigned  as head coach on March 6, 2020.

Head coaching record
Sources:

Personal life
Olivier has a daughter, Alexis, and coached her at UCLA from 2006 to 2008. She was previously married to chemical engineer Jim Olivier.

References

1959 births
Living people
American women's basketball coaches
Basketball coaches from California
Basketball players from California
Cal State Fullerton Titans women's basketball players
People from Placentia, California
Sportspeople from Los Angeles County, California
Sportspeople from Orange County, California
UC Irvine Anteaters women's basketball coaches
UCLA Bruins women's basketball coaches
UNLV Lady Rebels basketball coaches
UNLV Lady Rebels basketball players
USC Trojans women's basketball coaches
Forwards (basketball)